The Oxfordshire Blue Plaques Board established in 1999 was the brainchild of Sir Hugo Brunner, then Lord Lieutenant of Oxfordshire, and Edwin Townsend-Coles, Chairman of the Oxford Civic Society. The Board is an autonomous voluntary body whose members are drawn from cultural organisations and local government across the county. It awards and installs blue plaques on buildings in Oxford and Oxfordshire to commemorate very remarkable residents and, occasionally, historic events. For more detailed information, see the Board’s website.


Blue plaques in the City of Oxford

Blue plaques elsewhere in Oxfordshire

See also
 English Heritage

References

External links
 Oxfordshire Blue Plaques Board plaques recorded on openplaques.org

Lists of blue plaques
Culture in Oxfordshire
Organisations based in Oxfordshire
Blue Plaques
Blue Plaques
1999 establishments in England